West Central Historic District is a national historic district located at Anderson, Madison County, Indiana. Structures were constructed from the late 19th century to well into the first half of the 20th century. This long span of history was responsible for the great variety of styles found throughout the District. There are approximately 200 structures within this District which represent Italianate, Bungalow, Dutch Colonial, American Foursquare, and Shingle Styles.

It was listed in the National Register of Historic Places in 1984.

References

 Anderson: A Pictorial History by Esther Dittlinger, copyright 1991

External links
City website
Neighborhood association

Historic districts on the National Register of Historic Places in Indiana
Victorian architecture in Indiana
Buildings and structures in Anderson, Indiana
National Register of Historic Places in Madison County, Indiana